Eusebiu Iulian Tudor (born 1 July 1974 in Ploiești, Prahova County) is a Romanian former football midfielder. After he ended his playing career he worked as a  manager. He is currently the manager of Liga II club Metaloglobus București.

Honours

Player
Petrolul Ploiești
Divizia B: 2002–03

References

1974 births
Living people
Romanian footballers
Liga I players
Liga II players
Liga III players
FC Astra Giurgiu players
ASC Oțelul Galați players
CS Inter Gaz București players
FC Vaslui players
ACF Gloria Bistrița players
FC Petrolul Ploiești players
Romanian football managers
AFC Chindia Târgoviște managers
FC Petrolul Ploiești managers
FC Sportul Studențesc București managers
Ettifaq FC managers
Al-Shoulla FC managers
Khaleej FC managers
FC Metaloglobus București managers
Association football midfielders
Saudi First Division League managers
Romanian expatriate sportspeople in Saudi Arabia
Expatriate football managers in Saudi Arabia
Sportspeople from Ploiești